The 1972 Ole Miss Rebels baseball team represented the University of Mississippi in the 1972 NCAA University Division baseball season. The Rebels played their home games at Swayze Field. The team was coached by Jake Gibbs in his 1st year as head coach at Ole Miss.

The Rebels won the District III Playoff to advance to the College World Series, where they were defeated by the Texas Longhorns.  They would not make it to the College World Series again until 2014.

Roster

Schedule

! style="" | Regular Season
|- valign="top" 

|- bgcolor="#ccffcc"
| 1 || March 10 ||  || Swayze Field • Oxford, Mississippi || 8–7 || 1–0 || –
|- bgcolor="#ccffcc"
| 2 || March 10 || Kansas State || Swayze Field • Oxford, Mississippi || 10–5 || 2–0 || –
|- bgcolor="#ffcccc"
| 3 || March 11 || Kansas State || Swayze Field • Oxford, Mississippi || 1–8 || 2–1 || –
|- bgcolor="#ffcccc"
| 4 || March 11 || Kansas State || Swayze Field • Oxford, Mississippi || 7–10 || 2–2 || –
|- bgcolor="#ccffcc"
| 5 || March 17 || at  || Unknown • Hattiesburg, Mississippi || 9–1 || 3–2 || –
|- bgcolor="#ccffcc"
| 6 || March 18 || at Southern Mississippi || Unknown • Hattiesburg, Mississippi || 3–2 || 4–2 || –
|- bgcolor="#ffcccc"
| 7 || March 19 || at  || Eddie Stanky Field • Mobile, Alabama || 1–7 || 4–3 || –
|- bgcolor="#ffcccc"
| 8 || March 19 || at South Alabama || Eddie Stanky Field • Mobile, Alabama || 0–6 || 4–4 || –
|- bgcolor="#ffcccc"
| 9 || March 20 || at South Alabama || Eddie Stanky Field • Mobile, Alabama || 4–8 || 4–5 || –
|- bgcolor="#ccffcc"
| 10 || March 24 || Southern Mississippi || Swayze Field • Oxford, Mississippi || 4–3 || 5–5 || –
|- bgcolor="#ffcccc"
| 11 || March 24 || Southern Mississippi || Swayze Field • Oxford, Mississippi || 0–3 || 5–6 || –
|- bgcolor="#ccffcc"
| 12 || March 31 ||  || Swayze Field • Oxford, Mississippi || 2–1 || 6–6 || 1–0
|- bgcolor="#ccffcc"
| 13 || March 31 || LSU || Swayze Field • Oxford, Mississippi || 5–2 || 7–6 || 2–0
|-

|-
! style="" | Postseason
|- valign="top" 

|- bgcolor="#ccffcc"
| 14 || April 1 || LSU || Swayze Field • Oxford, Mississippi || 3–2 || 8–6 || 3–0
|- bgcolor="#ccffcc"
| 15 || April 7 ||  || Swayze Field • Oxford, Mississippi || 7–6 || 9–6 || 4–0
|- bgcolor="#ccffcc"
| 16 || April 7 || Alabama || Swayze Field • Oxford, Mississippi || 8–1 || 10–6 || 5–0
|- bgcolor="#ffcccc"
| 17 || April 8 || Alabama || Swayze Field • Oxford, Mississippi || 1–2 || 10–7 || 5–1
|- bgcolor="#ccffcc"
| 18 || April 14 ||  || Swayze Field • Oxford, Mississippi || 4–2 || 11–7 || 6–1
|- bgcolor="#ccffcc"
| 19 || April 14 || Mississippi State || Swayze Field • Oxford, Mississippi || 5–3 || 12–7 || 7–1
|- bgcolor="#ccffcc"
| 20 || April 15 || Mississippi State || Swayze Field • Oxford, Mississippi || 5–3 || 13–7 || 8–1
|- bgcolor="#ccffcc"
| 21 || April 17 ||  ||  Swayze Field • Oxford, Mississippi || 4–3 || 14–7 || 8–1
|- bgcolor="#ffcccc"
| 22 || April 19 || at Memphis State || Nat Buring Stadium • Memphis, Tennessee || 8–14 || 14–8 || 8–1
|- bgcolor="#ccffcc"
| 23 || April 21 || at Alabama || Sewell–Thomas Stadium • Tuscaloosa, Alabama || 3–1 || 15–8 || 9–1
|- bgcolor="#ccffcc"
| 24 || April 21 || at Alabama || Sewell–Thomas Stadium • Tuscaloosa, Alabama || 5–3 || 16–8 || 10–1
|- bgcolor="#ccffcc"
| 25 || April 22 || at Alabama || Sewell–Thomas Stadium • Tuscaloosa, Alabama || 13–6 || 17–8 || 11–1
|- bgcolor="#ffcccc"
| 26 || April 24 || Memphis State || Swayze Field • Oxford, Mississippi || 7–8 || 17–9 || 11–1
|- bgcolor="#ffcccc"
| 27 || April 25 || at Memphis State || Nat Buring Stadium • Memphis, Tennessee || 7–8 || 17–10 || 11–1
|- bgcolor="#ccffcc"
| 28 || April 28 || Mississippi State || Swayze Field • Oxford, Mississippi || 2–1 || 18–10 || 12–1
|- bgcolor="#ccffcc"
| 29 || April 28 || Mississippi State || Swayze Field • Oxford, Mississippi || 3–2 || 19–10 || 13–1
|- bgcolor="#ccffcc"
| 30 || April 29 || Mississippi State || Swayze Field • Oxford, Mississippi || 3–2 || 20–10 || 14–1
|-

|- bgcolor="#ccffcc"
| 31 || May 1 || at  || Unknown • Cleveland, Mississippi || 1–4 || 21–10 || 14–1
|- bgcolor="#ffcccc"
| 32 || May 5 || at LSU || Alex Box Stadium • Baton Rouge, Louisiana || 3–4 || 21–11 || 14–2
|- bgcolor="#ccffcc"
| 33 || May 5 || at LSU || Alex Box Stadium • Baton Rouge, Louisiana || 7–4 || 22–11 || 15–3
|- bgcolor="#ffcccc"
| 34 || May 6 || at LSU || Alex Box Stadium • Baton Rouge, Louisiana || 3–7 || 22–12 || 15–3
|-

|-
! style="" | Postseason
|- valign="top" 

|- bgcolor="#ccffcc"
| 35 || May 10 || at  || McGugin Field • Nashville, Tennessee || 5–3 || 23–12 || 15–3
|- bgcolor="#ccffcc"
| 36 || May 13 || Vanderbilt || Sawyze Field • Oxford, Mississippi || 5–4 || 24–12 || 15–3
|-

|- bgcolor="#ccffcc"
| 37 || June  || vs  || Sims Legion Park • Gastonia, North Carolina || 9–3 || 25–12 || 15–3
|- bgcolor="#ffcccc"
| 38 || June 2 || vs  || Sims Legion Park • Gastonia, North Carolina || 3–9 || 25–13 || 15–3
|- bgcolor="#ccffcc"
| 39 || June  || vs  || Sims Legion Park • Gastonia, North Carolina || 8–3 || 26–13 || 15–3
|- bgcolor="#ccffcc"
| 40 || June  || vs Virginia || Sims Legion Park • Gastonia, North Carolina || 9–0 || 27–13 || 15–3
|- bgcolor="#ccffcc"
| 41 || June  || vs South Alabama || Sims Legion Park • Gastonia, North Carolina || 8–4 || 28–13 || 15–3
|- bgcolor="#ccffcc"
| 42 || June  || vs South Alabama || Sims Legion Park • Gastonia, North Carolina || 12–1 || 29–13 || 15–3
|-

|- bgcolor="#ffcccc"
| 43 || June 9 || vs Southern California || Johnny Rosenblatt Stadium • Omaha, Nebraska || 6–8 || 29–14 || 15–3
|- bgcolor="#ffcccc"
| 44 || June 10 || vs Texas || Johnny Rosenblatt Stadium • Omaha, Nebraska || 8–9 || 29–15 || 15–3
|-

Awards and honors 
Steve Dillard
All-SEC
All-SEC Western Division
Third Team All-American American Baseball Coaches Association
All District III

Barry Gaddis
All-SEC Western Division

Paul Husband
All-SEC
All-SEC Western Division
First Team All-American American Baseball Coaches Association
First Team All-American Worth
All District III

Jim Pittman
All-SEC

Dennis Starr
All-SEC Western Division

Norris Weese
All-SEC Western Division

References

Ole Miss Rebels baseball seasons
Ole Miss Rebels baseball
College World Series seasons
Ole Miss
Southeastern Conference baseball champion seasons